Andi Kullolli (born 7 May 1991) is an Albanian football player. He most recently played as a forward for Luz i Vogël 2008 football club in the  Albanian Second Division.

References

External links
 Profile - FSHF

1991 births
Living people
People from Pogradec
Association football forwards
Albanian footballers
FK Sukhti players
KF Naftëtari Kuçovë players
FK Vora players
KS Shkumbini Peqin players
KF Erzeni players
Besa Kavajë players
KS Egnatia Rrogozhinë players
KF Luz i Vogël 2008 players
Kategoria e Parë players
Kategoria e Dytë players